Kseniya Volodymyrivna Sydorenko (born 2 July 1986) is a Ukrainian synchronized swimmer who competed in the women's duet at the 2008 and 2012 Summer Olympics as well as in the women's team at the 2016 Summer Olympics. She is twice 2017 World Aquatics Championships medalist, twice European champion and multiple European Championships medalist.

References

1986 births
Living people
Ukrainian synchronized swimmers
Olympic synchronized swimmers of Ukraine
Synchronized swimmers at the 2008 Summer Olympics
Synchronized swimmers at the 2012 Summer Olympics
Synchronized swimmers at the 2016 Summer Olympics
Synchronized swimmers at the 2020 Summer Olympics
World Aquatics Championships medalists in synchronised swimming
Synchronized swimmers at the 2005 World Aquatics Championships
Synchronized swimmers at the 2007 World Aquatics Championships
Synchronized swimmers at the 2009 World Aquatics Championships
Synchronized swimmers at the 2011 World Aquatics Championships
Synchronized swimmers at the 2015 World Aquatics Championships
Synchronized swimmers at the 2017 World Aquatics Championships
European Aquatics Championships medalists in synchronised swimming
Olympic bronze medalists for Ukraine
Olympic medalists in synchronized swimming
Medalists at the 2020 Summer Olympics
Sportspeople from Kharkiv
21st-century Ukrainian women